J40 may refer to:
 County Route J40 (California)
 Elongated pentagonal orthocupolarotunda, a Johnson solid (J40)
 , a Hunt-class minesweeper of the Royal Navy
 Toyota Land Cruiser (J40), a Japanese off-road vehicle
 Westinghouse J40, an American turbojet engine